Rakı or raki is an alcoholic drink made of twice-distilled grapes. It is the national drink of Turkey. It is also popular in other Balkan countries as an apéritif as well as in Kazakhstan. It is often served with seafood or meze. It is comparable to several other alcoholic beverages available around the Mediterranean and the Middle East, e.g. pastis, ouzo, sambuca, arak and aguardiente.

In Crete, tsikoudia is a pomace brandy that is sometimes called rakı. It is used to make rakomelo, which is flavoured with honey and cinnamon. Rakomelo is served warm during winter months. Cretan Raki does not contain anise, so it is not to be confused with the Turkish version.

Etymology 
The term raki entered English from Turkish . The Arabic word , means "distilled", other variants being araka, araki, ariki. The Teleuts, who are a Turkic ethnic group living in Siberia, use the term arakı for wine and other alcoholic drinks. Additionally, in  Ancient Greek the Grape (main ingredient for wine) was called ῥάξ.

History 
Where or when raki was first produced is unknown. It is first mentioned by the Ottoman explorer Evliya Çelebi during his travels in 1630. In his Book of Travels he reports that ancient people produced their own raki in small towns.

Until the last decades of the 19th century, the production of raki was done exclusively "at home", ie there was no mass industrial production. Colorless alcoholic beverages had long been consumed throughout the Mediterranean, known by various names: tsipouro, raki, arak, grappa. These are distilled from the by-products of wine, exploiting the vineyard as much as possible.

In the Ottoman Empire, until the 19th century, meyhanes run by Rûm (Greeks) and Albanians would mainly serve wine along with meze, due to religious restrictions imposed by various sultans. Although there were many Muslims among meyhane attendants, the authorities could, at times, prosecute them. With the relatively liberal atmosphere of the Tanzimat period (1839–1876), meyhane attendance among Muslims rose considerably, and raki became a favorite among meyhane-goers. By the end of the century, raki took its current standard form and its consumption surpassed that of wine.

During this period, rakı was produced by distillation of grapes pomace obtained during wine fermentation. When the amount of pomace was not sufficient, alcohol imported from Europe would be added.

With the collapse of the Ottoman Empire and the establishment of the modern-day Republic of Turkey, grape-based rakı began to be distilled by the state-owned spirits monopoly Tekel, with the first factory production taking place in 1944 in Izmir. With increasing sugar beet production, Tekel also began to distill the alcohol from molasses, and a new brand of raki made from sugar-beet alcohol was introduced under the name  ('new rakı'). Molasses gave  a distinctive bitter taste and helped increase the drink's popularity.

Today, with increased competition from the private sector, and the privatization of Tekel in 2004, several new brands and types of raki have emerged, each with its own distinct composition and production method, although the overall qualities of the drink have generally been kept consistent. , another recent brand, is aged in oak casks, which gives it a distinctive golden colour.

Production 
Raki is traditionally produced from raisin/grape spirit called suma that is distilled to a maximum of 94.55% abv. This spirit is not highly rectified spirit and unlike other flavoured spirits Raki producers consider that the suma has an important role to play in the flavour of Raki itself.

The suma, or suma mixed with highly rectified spirit, is diluted with water re-distilled with aniseed and the spirit is collected at around 79-80% abv. The flavoured distillate is diluted and sweetened and rested for minimum of 30 days prior to sale in order to allow the flavours to harmonize.

Serving and drinking 

In Turkey, rakı is the national drink and is traditionally consumed with chilled water on the side or partly mixed with chilled water, according to personal preference. Rakı is rarely consumed without the addition of water. Ice cubes are often added. Dilution with water causes rakı to turn a milky-white colour, similar to the louche of absinthe. Since  ('lion') is a Turkish colloquial metaphor for a strong, courageous man, this gives the term a meaning close to 'the milk for the strong'.

It is especially popular with seafood, together with fresh arugula,  and melon.

The founder and first President of the Republic of Turkey, Mustafa Kemal Atatürk, was very fond of rakı, drinking up to a half-litre daily (he died from cirrhosis of the liver at the age of 57), and his late-night  sessions were his favourite place to debate issues with his closest friends and advisors.

Types and brands 

Standard rakı is a grape product, though it may be produced from figs as well. Rakı produced from figs, particularly popular in the southern provinces of Turkey, is called incir boğması, incir rakısı ("fig rakı"), or in Arabic, tini. Tekel ceased producing fig rakı in 1947.

There are two methods of Turkish rakı production. One method uses raisins and other grapes. Yeni Rakı is produced from raisins and Tekirdağ Rakısı is produced from grapes. Fresh grape rakı is like ouzo but has a higher alcohol content.

Suma rakı, i.e. distilled rakı prior to the addition of aniseed, is generally produced from raisins but raki factories around established wine-producing areas like Tekirdağ, Nevşehir, and İzmir may also use fresh grapes for higher quality. Recently, yaş üzüm rakısı ("fresh-grape raki") has become more popular in Turkey. The maker of a recent brand, Efe Rakı, was the first company to produce raki exclusively of fresh grape suma, called Efe Yaş Üzüm Rakısı (Efe Fresh Grape Raki). Tekirdağ Altın Seri (Tekirdağ Golden Series) followed the trend and many others have been produced by other companies.

The best-known and popular brands of rakı, however, remain Yeni Rakı, originally produced by Tekel, which transferred production rights to Mey Alkol upon the 2004 privatization of Tekel, and Tekirdağ Rakısı from the region of Tekirdağ, which is famous for its characteristic flavour, believed to be due to the artesian waters of Çorlu used in its production. Yeni Rakı has an alcohol content of 45% and 1.5 grams of aniseed per liter; Tekirdağ Rakısı is 45% ABV and has 1.7 grams of aniseed per liter. There are also two top-quality brands called Kulüp Rakısı and Altınbaş, each with 50% ABV.

Dip rakısı ("bottom rakı") is the rakı that remains in the bottom of the tanks during production. Bottom rakı is thought to best capture the dense aroma and flavour of the spirit, and is also called özel rakı ("special raki"). It is not generally available commercially; instead, rakı factories reserve it as a prestigious gift for large clients.

Events
Aniseed-flavoured Rakı, has been celebrated as a festival in Adana and Northern Cyprus since 2010. World Rakı Festival in Adana, emerged from a hundred-year tradition of enjoying Adana kebab, with liver, şalgam and rakı. The event turned into a nationwide popular street festival, street musicians playing drums and zurna, entertain visitors all night long at the second Saturday night of every December. North Cyprus Rakı Festival is a week long festival taking place in Girne, Lefkoşa and Gazi Mağusa.

Other uses
In Crete tsikoudia is a pomace brandy that is sometimes called rakı but made from grapes. It is used to make rakomelo, which is flavored with honey and cinnamon and is served warm during winter months.

See also 

 Culture of Turkey
 Cuisine of Turkey
 List of aniseed-flavoured liqueurs
 Arak, a similar drink from the Levant and Iraq
 Ouzo, Greek aniseed flavoured drink
 Ouzo effect, the science behind the milky appearance
 Pastis, French anise-flavoured spirit
 Rakia, a fruit brandy popular in the Balkans
 Sambuca, an Italian aniseed flavoured drink
 Tsipouro, Greek distilled drink
 Vodka, a Polish-Russian clear distilled drink
 Zivania, the ouzo/tsipouro of Cyprus

References

Bibliography

External links 

Turkish national drink, Raki
About Raki subculture in Turkey 
Turkish Raki Commercial
Ottoman Food Map
In Istanbul, raki and a bottomless pit of gluttony 
Rodiaki Newspaper

Anise liqueurs and spirits
Turkish distilled drinks
Turkish inventions
Distilled drinks